The 1909 Drake Bulldogs football team was an American football team that represented Drake University in the Missouri Valley Conference (MVC) during the 1909 college football season. In its second season under head coach John L. Griffith, the team compiled a 7–1 record (2–1 against MVC opponents), finished in third place in the conference, shut out six of eight opponents, and outscored all opponents by a total of 138 to 36.

It was the first championship in the school's history. The team's only setback was against undefeated conference champion Missouri.

Center Bart Warren was the team captain. Fullback Purdy was the team's leading scorer, but sustained an injury against Iowa.

The team played its home games at Haskins Field.

Schedule

References

Drake
Drake Bulldogs football seasons
Drake Bulldogs football